7th SFFCC Awards
December 15, 2008

Best Picture: 
 Milk 
The 7th San Francisco Film Critics Circle Awards, honoring the best in film for 2008, were given on 15 December 2008.

Winners

Best Picture:
Milk
Best Director: 
Gus Van Sant – Milk
Best Original Screenplay: 
Milk – Dustin Lance Black
Best Adapted Screenplay: 
Frost/Nixon – Peter Morgan
Best Actor (tie): 
Sean Penn – Milk
Mickey Rourke – The Wrestler
Best Actress:
Sally Hawkins – Happy-Go-Lucky
Best Supporting Actor: 
Heath Ledger – The Dark Knight
Best Supporting Actress: 
Marisa Tomei – The Wrestler
Best Foreign Language Film: 
Let the Right One In (Låt den rätte komma in) • Sweden
Best Documentary:
My Winnipeg
Best Cinematography:
The Dark Knight – Wally Pfister
Marlon Riggs Award (for courage & vision in the Bay Area film community): 
Rob Nilsson – 9@Night

External links
2008 San Francisco Film Critics Circle Awards

References
S.F. film critics give top honors to 'Milk'

San Francisco Film Critics Circle Awards
2008 film awards